See the Sun may refer to:

 See the Sun (2003), an album by Black Lamb.
 See the Sun  (2005), an album buy Pete Murray.
 See See the Sun (1973), an album by Kayak.
 "See the Sun" (2003), a song by Dido from her second studio album Life for Rent.
 "See the Sun" (2008), a song by The Kooks from their second studio album Konk.